James Ralph Woodward (born 19 November 1963) is a former English cricketer. Woodward was a right-handed batsman.

Woodward made his List-A debut for Huntingdonshire in the 2000 NatWest Trophy against a Hampshire Cricket Board side.  He played 2 further List-A matches for Huntingdonshire, against Oxfordshire in the 1st round of the 2001 Cheltenham & Gloucester Trophy and a further game against Surrey Cricket Board in the 2nd round of the same competition.

In his 4 List-A matches, he scored 40 runs at a batting average of 10, with a high score of 30.

References

External links
James Woodward at Cricinfo
James Woodward at CricketArchive

1963 births
Sportspeople from Peterborough
English cricketers
Huntingdonshire cricketers
Living people